The 4th Pan Arab Games, a regional multi-sport event held in Arab countries, were held in Cairo, Egypt between September 2 and September 14, 1965. A total number of 1500 athletes from 14 countries participated in events in 12 sports.

Medals won by country

External links 
 https://inside.fei.org/fei/games/cont-regional/pan-arab

 
Pan Arab Games
Pan Arab Games
Pan Arab Games
Pan Arab Games
1965 Pan Arab Games, 1965
Multi-sport events in Egypt
1960s in Cairo
September 1965 sports events in Africa